Keith Brian Havelock Stevens (born 22 August 1942) is an English former cricketer. Stevens was a right-handed batsman.  He was born at Bombay (today Mumbai), India and was educated at Bradfield College in England.

Stevens made his debut for Berkshire in the 1960 Minor Counties Championship against Devon.  He played Minor counties cricket for Berkshire from 1960 to 1962, making ten appearances.  While studying at the University of Oxford, Stevens made his first-class debut for Oxford University Cricket Club against Glouestershire in 1962.  He made four further first-class appearances for the university that season, the last of which came against Middlesex.  In his five first-class appearances, he scored 102 runs at an average of 10.20, with a high score of 52, which came against Lancashire.

References

External links
Brian Stevens at ESPNcricinfo
Brian Stevens at CricketArchive

1942 births
Living people
Cricketers from Mumbai
People educated at Bradfield College
Alumni of Worcester College, Oxford
English cricketers
Berkshire cricketers
Oxford University cricketers